Tillandsia copalaensis is a species in the genus Tillandsia, endemic to Mexico.

References

copalaensis
Flora of Mexico